Kenowa Hills High School is a public secondary school in Alpine Township, Michigan, U.S. (near Grand Rapids). It serves grades 9-12 for the Kenowa Hills Public Schools district.

Academics
In the 2022 U.S. News & World Report annual survey of US high schools, Kenowa Hills ranked 193rd in Michigan and 5,768th nationally.

Demographics
The demographic breakdown of the 951 students enrolled for the 2021–2022 school year was: 

Male - 49.3%
Female - 50.7%
Native American/Alaskan - 0.4%
Asian - 1.8%
Black - 4.3%
Hispanic - 17.1%
Native Hawaiian/Pacific islander - 0.2%
White - 72.5%
Multiracial - 3.6%

39.6% of the students were eligible for free or reduced-cost lunch during COVID-19.

Athletics
The Kenowa Hills Knights compete in the Ottawa-Kent Conference. School colors are black and gold. The following Michigan High School Athletic Association (MHSAA) sanctioned sports are offered:

Kenowa Hills Football team is good but their JV team had a rough start to the 2020–2021 season with their record being 3-2
 
Baseball (boys) 
Basketball (girls and boys) 
Bowling (girls and boys) 
Competitive cheer (girls) 
Cross country (girls and boys) 
Football (boys) 
2nd place in state tournament - 1992
Golf (girls and boys) 
Gymnastics (girls) 
Ice hockey (boys) 
Lacrosse (boys) 
Soccer (girls and boys) 
Softball (girls) 
Swim and dive (girls and boys) 
Tennis (girls and boys) 
Track and field (girls and boys) 
Volleyball (girls)
Wrestling (boys)

References

External links

School district website

Public high schools in Michigan
Schools in Kent County, Michigan
Educational institutions established in 1999
Performing arts centers in Michigan
1999 establishments in Michigan